Clystea sanctula is a moth of the subfamily Arctiinae. It was described by Paul Dognin in 1911. It is found in Brazil.

References

Clystea
Moths described in 1911